Sacred theology is the name given to the theological degrees offered in a number of theological colleges, including the pontifical university system of the Catholic Church.

It is offered at the following levels:

Bachelor of Sacred Theology
Master of Sacred Theology (also an honorary degree for established scholars among Dominicans)
Licentiate of Sacred Theology (the Roman Catholic equivalent of a Masters; named STL)
Doctor of Sacred Theology

External links 

Pope John Paul II on ecclesiastical universities and facilities

Catholic education
Religious degrees